Télésphore Arsenault (January 1, 1872 – January 13, 1964) was a Canadian politician, business manager and farmer. He was elected to the House of Commons of Canada in the 1930 election in the riding of Kent as a Member of the Conservative Party and defeated in the 1935 election. He ran in the 1940 election as a Nationalist but lost.

Electoral record

External links 
 

1872 births
1964 deaths
Conservative Party of Canada (1867–1942) MPs
Members of the House of Commons of Canada from New Brunswick
Unionist Party (Canada) MPs